The Marling baronetcy, of Stanley Park and Sedbury Park in the County of Gloucester, is a title in the Baronetage of the United Kingdom. It was created on 22 May 1882 for the cloth manufacturer and Liberal politician Samuel Marling. The second Baronet served as high sheriff of Gloucester in 1888. The third Baronet was a Colonel in the Army and was awarded the Victoria Cross. Folk musician Laura Marling is the third and youngest daughter of the fifth Baronet.

Marling baronets, of Stanley Park and Sedbury Park (1882)
Sir Samuel Stephens Marling, 1st Baronet (1810–1883)
Sir William Henry Marling, 2nd Baronet (1835–1919)
Sir Percival Scrope Marling, 3rd Baronet (1861–1936)
Sir John Stanley Vincent Marling, 4th Baronet (1910–1977)
Sir Charles William Somerset Marling, 5th Baronet (born 1951)

There is no heir to the title. The 5th baronet and his wife were the parents of Laura Marling who became a singer-songwriter.

Notes

References 
Kidd, Charles & Williamson, David (editors). Debrett's Peerage and Baronetage (1990 edition). New York: St Martin's Press, 1990, 

Marling